The term soft landscape is used by gardeners and practitioners of landscape design, landscape architecture, and garden design to describe the vegetative materials which are used to improve a landscape by design. The corresponding term hard landscape is used to describe construction materials. The range of soft landscape materials includes each layer of the ecological sequence: aquatic plants, semi-aquatic plants, field layer plants (including grasses and herbaceous plants), shrubs, and trees.

See also

 Hedge (gardening)
 Herbaceous border
 Shrub
 Tree
 Planting design
 Potting mix

Garden design
Garden plants
Landscape architecture